
Year 461 BC was a year of the pre-Julian Roman calendar. At the time, it was known as the Year of the Consulship of Gallus and Cornutus (or, less frequently, year 293 Ab urbe condita). The denomination 461 BC for this year has been used since the early medieval period, when the Anno Domini calendar era became the prevalent method in Europe for naming years.

Events 
 By place 
 Greece 
 In Athens, Ephialtes and Pericles finally get agreement to the ostracism of Kimon, who had become unpopular for his unsuccessful pro-Spartan policy.
 Ephialtes, with the support of Pericles, reduces the power of the Athenian Council of Areopagus (filled with ex-archons and so a stronghold of oligarchy) and transfers them to the people, i.e. the Council of Five Hundred, the Assembly and the popular law courts. The office of Judge is made a paid position and is recruited by lot from a list to which every citizen can have his name added.
 Ephialtes is murdered by Aristodicus of Tanagra in Boeotia, who is said to have acted on behalf of members of the Athenian oligarchy.
 The ostracism of Kimon and the murder of Ephialtes leave Pericles as the most influential orator in Athens.

Births

Deaths 
 Ephialtes, leader of the radical democrats in Athens (assassinated)

References